The 2007 AMA National Speedway Championship Series was staged over three rounds, which were held at Costa Mesa (June 2), Auburn (June 11) and Auburn (August 31). Billy Hamill took the title, his third in total, winning two of the rounds in the process.

Event format 
Over the course of 20 heats, each rider raced against every other rider once. The field was then split into sections of four riders, with the top four entering the 'A' Final. Points were then awarded depending on where a rider finished in each final. The points in the 'A' Final were awarded thus, 21, 18, 16 and 14.

Classification

References 

AMA
United States
Speed
Speed